Champak Jain ( – 31 October 2019) was an Indian film producer who produced many Hindi films. He was the owner of Venus Records & Tapes Pvt Ltd.

Biography
Jain was the owner of Venus Records & Tapes Pvt Ltd. He produced films like Khiladi (1992), Baazigar (1993), Main Khiladi Tu Anari (1994), Josh (2000), Humraaz (2002), Hulchul (2004) and more. He died on 31 October 2019 at the age of 52.

Selected filmography
  Khiladi (1992)
 Baazigar (1993)
 Main Khiladi Tu Anari (1994)
 Yes Boss (1997)
 Josh (2000)
 Humraaz (2002)
 Hungama (2003)
 Hulchul (2004)
 Aap Ki Khatir (2006)
 Maan Gaye Mughal-e-Azam (2008)
 De Dana Dan (2009)
 Kis Kisko Pyaar Karoon (2015)

References

1960s births
2019 deaths
Hindi film producers
Indian film producers